Daegu Health College provides medical training to aspiring professionals in Daegu metropolitan city, South Korea.  The current president is Nam Seong-hui (남성희).  About 100 instructors are employed.

Academics

The courses of study are divided among five divisions:  Health (which includes fields such as clinical pathology and radiology), Nursing, Medical Industry, Social Work, and Arts.

History

The college opened its doors as Daegu Technical School of Health (대구보건전문학교) in 1971.  Its status was raised to that of a technical college in 1979, and in 1998 it became simply Daegu Health College.

See also
List of colleges and universities in South Korea
Education in South Korea

External links
Official school website, in Korean

Universities and colleges in Daegu
1971 establishments in South Korea
Educational institutions established in 1971